Vajjada II was Shilahara  ruler of north Konkan branch from 1010 CE – 1015 CE.

Aparajita was succeeded by his son Vajjada II, about whom only conventional praise is given in the records of his successors. An inscription from Hangal, however, tells us that Kundaladevi, the queen of the Kadamba king Chhattadeva (Shashthadeva II) (1005 CE - 1055 CE) was the daughter of the king Vachavya of Thani, i.e., Thane. As Dr. Altekar conjectured this king of Thane was probably the Shilahara king Vajjada II.(Dept. Gazetteer: 2002)

See also
 Shilahara

References
 Bhandarkar R.G. (1957): Early History of Deccan, Sushil Gupta (I) Pvt Ltd, Calcutta.
 Fleet J.F (1896): "The Dynasties of the Kanarese District of The Bombay Presidency", written for The Bombay Gazetteer.
 Department of Gazetteer, Govt of Maharashtra (2002): Itihaas : Prachin Kal, Khand -1 (Marathi)
 Department of Gazetteer, Govt of Maharashtra (1960): Kolhapur District Gazetteer
 Department of Gazetteer, Govt of Maharashtra (1964): Kolaba District Gazetteer
 Department of Gazetteer, Govt of Maharashtra (1982): Thane District Gazetteer
 A.S.Altekar (1936): The Silaharas of Western India.

External links
 Silver Coin of Shilaharas of Southern Maharashtra (Coinex 2006 - Souvenir)

Shilahara dynasty
11th-century rulers in Asia